The Batten was a British car made in Beckenham, Kent between 1935 and 1938 based on the 1932 Ford Model 18 V-8. The cars were successfully campaigned in trials and racing events.

Of the several Anglo-American hybrid cars produced in the late 1930s the Batten probably had the highest performance.

Early cars had very basic racing bodies but retained several Ford panels including the radiator grille. Later cars got progressively more civilised and stylish.

About ten cars were made in total.

See also
 List of car manufacturers of the United Kingdom

References 

Defunct motor vehicle manufacturers of England
Vehicle manufacturing companies established in 1935
Defunct companies based in Kent